The Malpelo barnacle blenny (Acanthemblemaria stephensi) is a species of chaenopsid blenny found in coral reefs around Malpelo Island, in the eastern Pacific ocean. This species feeds primarily on zooplankton. The specific name honours the environmental biologist John S. Stephens Jr.

References

stephensi
Fish of Colombia
Endemic fauna of Colombia
Malpelo barnacle blenny